Janežič is a Slovene surname. Notable people with the surname include:

Anton Janežič (1828–1869), Carinthian Slovene linguist and philologist
Luka Janežič (born 1995), Slovenian sprinter
Tomi Janežič (born 1972), Slovenian theatre director

Slovene-language surnames